Cirkus may refer to:

 Cirkus (Stockholm), arena in Stockholm
 CirKus, trip-hop band
 "Cirkus", a song by King Crimson
 Cirkus: The Young Persons' Guide to King Crimson Live
 Cirkus (film), a 2022 Indian film
 Cirkus (1939 film), a Danish-Swedish film

See also 
 Circus